Anna, I, Anna is a 1969 novel by Danish author Klaus Rifbjerg. It won the Nordic Council Literature Prize in 1970.

References

1969 Danish novels
Danish-language novels
Nordic Council's Literature Prize-winning works